Sitka is an unincorporated community in Liberty Township, White County, in the U.S. state of Indiana.

History
A post office was established at Sitka in 1877, and remained in operation until it was discontinued in 1903. A small general store was opened soon after the post office. The community most likely was named after Sitka, Alaska.

Geography

References

Unincorporated communities in White County, Indiana
Unincorporated communities in Indiana